Minuscule 359 (in the Gregory-Aland numbering), ε 317 (Soden), is a Greek minuscule manuscript of the New Testament, on paper. Palaeographically it has been assigned to the 13th century. 
It has marginalia. It was known as Codex Mutinensis 9.

Description 

The codex contains a complete text of the four Gospels on 310 paper leaves. It is written in one column per page, in 19 lines per page.

There is also a division according to the Ammonian Sections, (references to the Eusebian Canons were added by a later hand).

It contains the Epistula ad Carpianum, Eusebian Canon tables, Prolegomena, lectionary markings at the margin (for liturgical use), incipits, Synaxarion, and Menologion.

Text 

The Greek text of the codex is a representative of the Byzantine text-type. Hermann von Soden classified it to the textual family Kx. Aland placed it in Category V.
According to the Claremont Profile Method it represents textual family Kx in Luke 1, Luke 10, and Luke 20.

History 

The manuscript was added to the list of New Testament manuscripts by Scholz (1794–1852). 
It was examined by Burgon. C. R. Gregory saw it in 1886.

The manuscript is currently housed at the Biblioteca Estense (G. 242, a.T.7.23 (III B 16)) in Modena.

See also 

 List of New Testament minuscules
 Biblical manuscript
 Textual criticism

References

Further reading 

 

Greek New Testament minuscules
13th-century biblical manuscripts
Biblioteca Estense